Roger Moret (25 September 1901 – 25 November 1972) was a Swiss composer. His work was part of the music event in the art competition at the 1928 Summer Olympics.

References

1901 births
1972 deaths
Swiss composers
Olympic competitors in art competitions
People from Lausanne